Mamma Mia! The Movie Soundtrack   is the soundtrack album for the 2008 jukebox musical film Mamma Mia!, based on the 1999 stage musical of the same name. Released on July 8, 2008, by Decca and Polydor Records in the United States and internationally, respectively, it features performances by the film's cast including Meryl Streep, Amanda Seyfried, Pierce Brosnan, Dominic Cooper, Stellan Skarsgård, Colin Firth, Julie Walters, Christine Baranski, Ashley Lilley, and Rachel McDowall. The recording was produced by Benny Andersson who along with Björn Ulvaeus had produced the original ABBA recordings. Additionally, many of the musicians from the original ABBA recordings participated in making the soundtrack album. In keeping with the setting, the musical arrangements featured the use of traditional Greek instruments, most noticeably the bouzouki. The deluxe edition of the soundtrack album was released on November 25, 2008.

The album was nominated for a Grammy Award for Best Compilation Soundtrack Album for Motion Picture, Television or Other Visual Media.

Track listing

CD
"Honey, Honey" - Amanda Seyfried, Ashley Lilley & Rachel McDowall - 3:08
"Money, Money, Money" - Meryl Streep, Julie Walters & Christine Baranski - 3:06
"Mamma Mia" - Meryl Streep - 3:34
"Dancing Queen" - Meryl Streep, Julie Walters & Christine Baranski - zb 4:04
"Our Last Summer" - Colin Firth, Pierce Brosnan, Stellan Skarsgård, Amanda Seyfried & Meryl Streep - 2:57
"Lay All Your Love on Me" - Dominic Cooper & Amanda Seyfried - 4:29
"Super Trouper" - Meryl Streep, Julie Walters & Christine Baranski - 3:53
"Gimme! Gimme! Gimme! (A Man After Midnight)" - Amanda Seyfried, Ashley Lilley & Rachel McDowall - 3:51
"The Name of the Game" - Amanda Seyfried - 4:55
"Voulez-Vous" - Full Cast - 4:35
"SOS" - Pierce Brosnan & Meryl Streep - 3:19
"Does Your Mother Know" - Christine Baranski & Philip Michael - 3:01
"Slipping Through My Fingers" - Meryl Streep & Amanda Seyfried - 3:50
"The Winner Takes It All" - Meryl Streep - 4:57
"When All Is Said and Done" - Pierce Brosnan & Meryl Streep - 3:17
"Take a Chance on Me" - Julie Walters, Stellan Skarsgård, Colin Firth, Phillip Michael & Christine Baranski - 4:01
"I Have a Dream" - Amanda Seyfried - 4:22
"Thank You for the Music" (Hidden track) - Amanda Seyfried - 3:44

Notes
 On the CD pressings, "Thank You for the Music" is a hidden track which begins after 30 seconds of silence following "I Have a Dream", making track 17's total length 8:36.

Deluxe edition
The Deluxe Edition of the soundtrack features the original soundtrack (with no new songs) and a bonus DVD that features a "Behind the Music" special that shows some of the recording process for the movie, as well as a music video for "Gimme! Gimme! Gimme! (A Man After Midnight)" featuring Amanda Seyfried. The booklet for the deluxe edition is different from the original, containing all the lyrics, an article written by Musical Director Martin Lowe, taping location info, and additional photos from the movie.

Limited vinyl edition
In 2017, a limited run of the soundtrack was released onto vinyl in the US, and was sold exclusively by Barnes & Noble. As part of 'Vinyl Week', in March 2018, HMV released an exclusive limited edition of the soundtrack on picture discs. With only 1000 produced, 2 are included which contain high quality images on both sides.

Commercial performance
The album peaked at #1 in the USA on the Billboard 200 albums chart in August 2008. It was certified Platinum by the RIAA on August 18, 2008, and has sold 1,694,000 copies in the United States as of July 2014.  Worldwide, the soundtrack has sold over 5 million copies to date, spending a total of 2 weeks at #1 on the world charts.

While the album was originally ineligible for the Official UK Albums Chart, it peaked atop the Official Soundtrack Albums Chart for 15 consecutive weeks and was outselling the top 10 albums in the UK Albums Chart. Following the release of Mamma Mia! Here We Go Again, the album entered the UK chart for the first time, peaking at number 5 on the chart. In New Zealand, the album debuted at number 8 on July 14, 2008, and climbed to number one the following week. In Greece, it peaked at number one on the international chart and number 1 on the main albums chart for many weeks. In Australia, the album reached #1 in its second week on the ARIA Albums Chart, knocking off the highly successful Coldplay album Viva la Vida or Death and All His Friends.
In Austria, peaked at No. 1 for 6 weeks and returned to the top 10, at No. 8, 10 years after its release due to the release of the sequel Mamma Mia! Here We Go Again.

"Honey, Honey" has also charted at #16 on the Norwegian Singles Chart and #50 on the Australian ARIA Singles Chart, due to high download sales. Other tracks selling well enough to chart in Australia include "Gimme! Gimme! Gimme! (A Man After Midnight)" (#70), "Lay All Your Love on Me" (#85), "Dancing Queen" (#96) and "Mamma Mia" (#98).

Charts

Weekly charts

Year-end charts

Certifications

Accolades
 Grammy Award
 Best Compilation Soundtrack Album for Motion Picture, Television or Other Visual Media—nominated

Cast
 Amanda Seyfried as Sophie Sheridan
 Meryl Streep as Donna Sheridan
 Pierce Brosnan as Sam Carmichael
 Stellan Skarsgård as Bill Anderson
 Colin Firth as Harry Bright
 Julie Walters as Rosie Mulligan
 Christine Baranski as Tanya Chesham-Leigh
 Dominic Cooper as Sky
 Philip Michael as Pepper

Musicians
 Benny Andersson - piano, keyboards
 Rutger Gunnarsson - bass, bouzouki
 Per Lindvall - drums
 Lasse Wellander - guitars, bouzouki
 Jörgen Stenberg - percussion
 Lasse Jonsson - acoustic guitars
 Jan Bengtson - flute, piccolo, baritone saxophone
 Pär Grebacken - recorder, clarinet, saxophones
 Perra Moraeus - alto saxophone
 Leif Lindvall - trumpet
 Calle Jakobsson - tuba
 Kalle Moraeus - bouzouki, guitar, violin

References

External links
 Amazon

2008 soundtrack albums
Mamma Mia!
Musical film soundtracks
Comedy film soundtracks
ABBA tribute albums